The Cuban Workers' Solidarity (STC) is a trade union organization in exile for Cuba. It is based in Caracas, Venezuela, and is affiliated with the International Trade Union Confederation.

References

External links

 www.webstc.org

Trade unions in Cuba
International Trade Union Confederation
Cuba solidarity groups